The Scytonemataceae are a family of filamentous, heterocystous cyanobacteria within the order Nostocales. The family is known from freshwater, marine, and terrestrial environments, where it grows in colonies attached to the substrate. Akinetes are not known, and the members of the family are known to reproduce with nonheterocystous hormogonia.

References

External links
 

Nostocales
Cyanobacteria families